NGC 169 is a barred spiral galaxy located in the constellation Andromeda. It was discovered on September 18, 1857 by R. J. Mitchell.

NGC 169 has a smaller companion named NGC 169A, also designated IC1559. The two are currently interacting, and the pair is included in Halton Arp's Atlas of Peculiar Galaxies.

References

External links
 

0169
00365
02202
282
Barred spiral galaxies
Interacting galaxies
Andromeda (constellation)